Gregory Keith Bell (born June 22, 1962) is an American businessman and politician. A Republican, in 2018 he was elected to represent the 4th District in the Texas House of Representatives. Bell assumed office in January 2019. He succeeded fellow Republican Lance Gooden, who was instead elected to the United States House of Representatives. Prior to winning election to the Texas House, Bell was the president of the Forney, Texas, school board.

References

External links
 Campaign website
 State legislative page
 Keith Bell at the Texas Tribune

Living people
Republican Party members of the Texas House of Representatives
21st-century American politicians
1962 births
People from Forney, Texas
Businesspeople from Texas